Wheeleria raphiodactyla is a moth of the family Pterophoridae. It is found in Portugal, Spain and France.

References

Moths described in 1901
Pterophorini
Moths of Europe